Guliana may refer to:

 Guliana, Gujrat
 Guliana, Rawalpindi